Human Touch is a 2004 film directed by Paul Cox and starring Jacqueline McKenzie, Chris Haywood and Aaron Blabey. The plot follows the story of Anna who is a singer trying to raise money for her choir's trip to China. She does this by posing nude for an ageing artist and upon seeing the finished results goes on a journey of self-discovery.

See also
 Cinema of Australia

References

External links
 

2004 films
2004 drama films
Australian drama films
Films directed by Paul Cox
2000s English-language films
2000s Australian films